Eifelpark is a wildlife and leisure park in Gondorf near Bitburg in the Eifel mountains of Germany.

Eifel Park may also refer to:
 Eifel National Park, a park in North Rhine-Westphalia, Germany
 Volcanic Eifel Nature Park, a park in Rhineland-Palatinate, Germany
 Vulkanland Eifel Geopark, a park in Germany
 High Fens – Eifel Nature Park, a German-Belgian park

See also
 Champ de Mars, the park that contains the Eiffel Tower in Paris, France